The Islands was a provincial electoral district in the Canadian province of British Columbia.  It first appeared on the hustings in the 1890 provincial election and lasted until it was integrated into the new riding Nanaimo and The Islands at the 1941 election.

Notable MLAs

This Nanaimo-Gulf Islands area riding's first appearance was in 1903.  It was originally created for the 1890 election, but was redistributed and done away with for the 1894 election, but it was brought back again in the large redistribution that set the stage for the watershed 1903 election, which ended the no-party era in the BC House.  The Islands then lasted until the 1937 election, and subsequently parts of it became Nanaimo and the Islands, which was a riding in elections from 1941 to 1963, or in other Nanaimo-area electoral districts.

Parts of the area covered by The Islands are currently represented by various newer ridings:
Nanaimo 1996–present
Saanich North and the Islands (current)
Saanich and the Islands (past)

Electoral history
Note: Winners of each election are in bold.

|-

|- bgcolor="white"
!align="right" colspan=3|Total valid votes
!align="right"|115
!align="right"|100.00%
!align="right"|
|- bgcolor="white"
!align="right" colspan=3|Total rejected ballots
!align="right"|
!align="right"|
!align="right"|
|- bgcolor="white"
!align="right" colspan=3|Turnout
!align="right"|%
!align="right"|
!align="right"|
|}

For the 1890 election The Islands was redistributed between North Nanaimo, South Nanaimo and Cowichan-Alberni.  It did not appear again until 1903:

|-

 
|Liberal
|Thomas Wilson Paterson|align="right"|221|align="right"|58.93%|align="right"|
|align="right"|unknown
|- bgcolor="white"
!align="right" colspan=3|Total valid votes
!align="right"|375
!align="right"|100.00%
!align="right"|
|- bgcolor="white"
!align="right" colspan=3|Total rejected ballots
!align="right"|
!align="right"|
!align="right"|
|- bgcolor="white"
!align="right" colspan=3|Turnout
!align="right"|%
!align="right"|
!align="right"|
|}

|-

 
|Liberal
|Thomas Wilson Paterson
|align="right"|173
|align="right"|47.66%
|align="right"|
|align="right"|unknown
|- bgcolor="white"
!align="right" colspan=3|Total valid votes
!align="right"|363
!align="right"|100.00%
!align="right"|
|- bgcolor="white"
!align="right" colspan=3|Total rejected ballots
!align="right"|
!align="right"|
!align="right"|
|- bgcolor="white"
!align="right" colspan=3|Turnout
!align="right"|%
!align="right"|
!align="right"|
|}

|-

 
|Liberal
|Percy Purvis
|align="right"|207
|align="right"|43.40%
|align="right"|
|align="right"|unknown
|- bgcolor="white"
!align="right" colspan=3|Total valid votes
!align="right"|477
!align="right"|100.00%
!align="right"|
|- bgcolor="white"
!align="right" colspan=3|Total rejected ballots
!align="right"|
!align="right"|
!align="right"|
|- bgcolor="white"
!align="right" colspan=3|Turnout
!align="right"|%
!align="right"|
!align="right"|
|}

|-

|- bgcolor="white"
!align="right" colspan=3|Total valid votes
!align="right"|456
!align="right"|100.00%

|-

 
|Liberal|Malcolm Bruce Jackson|align="right"|358|align="right"|50.28%|align="right"|
|align="right"|unknown
|- bgcolor="white"
!align="right" colspan=3|Total valid votes
!align="right"|712
!align="right"|100.00%
!align="right"|
|- bgcolor="white"
!align="right" colspan=3|Total rejected ballots
!align="right"|
!align="right"|
!align="right"|
|- bgcolor="white"
!align="right" colspan=3|Turnout
!align="right"|%
!align="right"|
!align="right"|
|}

|-
 
|Liberal
|Malcolm Bruce Jackson
|align="right"|463
|align="right"|38.71%
|align="right"|
|align="right"|unknown

|- bgcolor="white"
!align="right" colspan=3|Total valid votes
!align="right"|1,706
!align="right"|100.00%
!align="right"|
|- bgcolor="white"
!align="right" colspan=3|Total rejected ballots
!align="right"|
!align="right"|
!align="right"|
|- bgcolor="white"
!align="right" colspan=3|Turnout
!align="right"|%
!align="right"|
!align="right"|
|}

|-
 
|Liberal
|Malcolm Bruce Jackson
|align="right"|683
|align="right"|37.30%
|align="right"|
|align="right"|unknown

|- bgcolor="white"
!align="right" colspan=3|Total valid votes
!align="right"|1,831
!align="right"|100.00%
!align="right"|
|- bgcolor="white"
!align="right" colspan=3|Total rejected ballots
!align="right"|44
!align="right"|
!align="right"|
|- bgcolor="white"
!align="right" colspan=3|Turnout
!align="right"|%
!align="right"|
!align="right"|
|}

|-

 
|Co-operative Commonwealth Fed.
|William Ellis
|align="right"|400
|align="right"|19.47%

|Independent
|William Henry Russell Humber
|align="right"|26
|align="right"|1.27%
|align="right"|
|align="right"|unknown
 
|Liberal|Alexander McDonald|align="right"|726|align="right"|35.35%'''
|align="right"|
|align="right"|unknown
|- bgcolor="white"
!align="right" colspan=3|Total valid votes
!align="right"|1,284
!align="right"|100.00%
!align="right"|
|- bgcolor="white"
!align="right" colspan=3|Total rejected ballots
!align="right"|34
!align="right"|
!align="right"|
|- bgcolor="white"
!align="right" colspan=3|Turnout
!align="right"|%
!align="right"|
!align="right"|
|}

|-

|Co-operative Commonwealth Fed.
|Grace E. Burtt Martin 
|align="right"|414
|align="right"|19.60%
|align="right"|
|align="right"|unknown

|Liberal
|Alexander McDonald
|align="right"|694
|align="right"|32.86%
|align="right"|
|align="right"|unknown
|- bgcolor="white"
!align="right" colspan=3|Total valid votes
!align="right"|2,112
!align="right"|100.00%
!align="right"|
|- bgcolor="white"
!align="right" colspan=3|Total rejected ballots
!align="right"|21
!align="right"|
!align="right"|
|- bgcolor="white"
!align="right" colspan=3|Turnout
!align="right"|%
!align="right"|
!align="right"|
|}

In 1941, the area was redistributed into the new Nanaimo and the Islands riding.  Parts of it are now in Saanich North and the Islands.

References
Elections BC Historical Returns

Former provincial electoral districts of British Columbia on Vancouver Island